"One Better World" is a song by English band ABC, released as the first single from their fifth studio album, Up (1989).

The song, sung with accompanying children's chorus, concerned love, peace and tolerance ("one better world"), and peaked at No. 32 on the UK Singles Chart, becoming their final top 40 hit.

Track listing
 UK 7" Single
"One Better World" – 3:43
"One Better World" (Percapella Mix) – 3:59

 UK 12" Single
Side one
"One Better World" (Club Mix) – 5:55
Side two
"One Better World" (Garage Mix) – 6:02
"One Better World" (Percapella Mix) – 3:56

Chart performance

References

ABC (band) songs
1989 singles
Songs written by Mark White (musician)
Songs written by Martin Fry
1989 songs
PolyGram singles